The 2020 Nagoya Grampus season was Nagoya Grampus' 3rd season back in the J1 League following their relegation at the end of the 2016 season, their 27th J1 League season and 37th overall in the Japanese top flight. Nagoya Grampus finished the season in Third Position, qualifying for the Play-off Round of the 2021 AFC Champions League. Due to finishing third, Nagoya Grampus did not qualify for the re-formatted 2020 Emperor's Cup, which if a J1 team were to win would put Nagoya Grampus directly into the AFC Champions League Group Stage.

Season events
On 20 December 2019, Massimo Ficcadenti agreed a new contract to manage Nagoya Grampus for the 2020 season. The following day, 21 December 2019, Kazuhiko Chiba signed a new one-year contract with Nagoya Grampus.

On 24 December 2019, Yohei Takeda signed a new one-year contract with Nagoya Grampus, whilst Naoki Maeda extended his contract for the 2020 season the next day.

On 26 December 2019, Mitchell Langerak and Ariajasuru Hasegawa signed a new contracts until the end of the 2020 season.

On 27 December, Shumpei Naruse signed a new contract with Nagoya Grampus for the 2020 season, with Yutaka Yoshida following suit the next day.

On 5 January, Nagoya Grampus announced the signing of Ryogo Yamasaki from Shonan Bellmare, and that Shinnosuke Nakatani had renewed his contract with Nagoya Grampus for the 2020 season. The following day, 6 January, João Schmidt and Ryota Aoki renewed their contracts with Nagoya Grampus for the 2020 season.

On 7 January, Shuto Watanabe and Kosuke Ota renewed there contracts with Nagoya Grampus for the 2020 season, whilst Kazuya Miyahara renewed his contract for the 2020 season on 8 January.

On 9 January, Tsubasa Shibuya renewed his contract with Nagoya Grampus for the 2020 season, Takashi Kanai returned from his loan deal at Sagan Tosu and Jonathan Matsuoka joined ReinMeer Aomori on loan for the 2020 season.

On 25 February, all football scheduled to be played between 28 February and 15 March, was suspended as a result of the COVID-19 pandemic. On 12 March, Nagoya Grampus announced that their upcoming games on 18 March & 22 March, against Yokohama and Urawa Red Diamonds, had also been postponed due to the COVID-19 pandemic. 13 days, 25 March, a further 9 games, scheduled between 3 April and 6 May, where postponed to prevent the spread of Coronavirus. Also on 25 March, Nagoya Grampus announced the signing of Mu Kanazaki on loan from Sagan Tosu until 31 January 2021.

On 2 June, Nagoya Grampus announced that Mu Kanazaki had tested positive for COVID-19, with the club announcing four days later that Mitchell Langerak had also tested positive for COVID-19.

On 5 June, the group stage of the 2020 J.League Cup was reduced from a 6 games to 3 games, resulting in Nagoya Grampus' away games against Kawasaki Frontale and Kashima Antlers, as well as their home game against Shimizu S-Pulse were cancelled.

On 21 June, Nagoya Grampus announced that their contract with Jô had been terminated, and that the matter was with the FIFA after Jô had signed for Corinthians whilst still under contract with Nagoya Grampus.

On 9 July, Nagoya Grampus confirmed the signing of Oh Jae-suk from Gamba Osaka.

On 25 July, Nagoya Grampus announced that Kazuya Miyahara had tested positive for COVID-19. The following day, Shuto Watanabe and coaching staff also tested positive for COVID-19, resulting in the postponement of that afternoon's match between Nagoya Grampus and Sanfrecce Hiroshima.

Squad

Out on loan

Transfers

In

Out

Loans in

Loans out

Released

Friendlies

Competitions

J. League

Results summary

Results by round

Results

League table

J. League Cup

Group stage

Knockout stage

Emperor's Cup

Squad statistics

Appearances and goals

|-
|colspan="14"|Players away on loan:
|-
|colspan="14"|Players who left Nagoya Grampus during the season:
|}

Goal Scorers

Clean sheets

Disciplinary record

References

Nagoya Grampus
Nagoya Grampus seasons